"Top Secret" is the sixteenth episode of the third season of House and the sixty-second episode overall. In the episode, a man claims to have Gulf War Syndrome, while Cameron seduces Chase, and House has a urination disorder due to Vicodin.

Plot
The episodes opens with a US Marine Humvee being hit by an RPG in Iraq. One man drags out a Marine with a severed leg into a clearing and then the Marine is shown to be House. The whole scenario turns out to be House's dream, and when he wakes up, Cuddy presents him with a new case. House recognizes him as the man who dragged him out of the burning vehicle from the dream. House treats the man, whom Cuddy reveals to be the nephew of a hospital donor and a recently discharged Marine, who complains of Gulf War syndrome. The fact that House had a dream in his office just before being given the case that included this patient causes House to try to figure out how he could have possibly met this man before. House sends his team to investigate the patient's identity as well as his condition.

During a polysomnogram, the patient is left alone in an observation room during which Cameron "seduces" Chase into having sex next door. Foreman casually comes in to check on the patient, who is overwhelmed by a foul odor, which turns out to be bacteria in his mouth. Foreman questions Cameron and Chase later about why they were absent. Cameron admits having sex with Chase, but Foreman takes it as a joke.

Meanwhile, House ultimately relieves his urination problem by inserting a catheter in himself. Following this relief, he is able to sleep, leading him to have another dream. House wakes up and correctly diagnoses the patient with hereditary hemorrhagic telangiectasia, surprising the team.

House finally recognizes the patient and approaches Cuddy for lying to him that the patient was the nephew of a hospital donor. House realizes where he met the patient before, one of Cuddy's dates, and confronts Cuddy who responds that House only remembered the man because he was Cuddy's date. Cuddy tells House to get over her.

House catches Cameron and Chase in a storage closet while disposing some files, leaving both of them with shocked expressions on their faces at House's seemingly apathetic attitude to catching them.

Reception 

 On March 28, 2007, Staci Krause from IGN claimed that the episode was very confusing, but entertaining throughout. She said it was a very good episode, mostly due to the detail behind the relationship of House and Cuddy.

Soundtrack 
Source:

 "Dimension" - Wolfmother"
 "Get Down Tonight" - K.C. and the Sunshine Band
 "Piano Quintet in A major, Op. 114, D667: For Ellen" - Franz Schubert
 "Superfly" - Curtis Mayfield

Guest appearances 
Source:

 Hira Ambrosino - Dr. Chen
 Marc Blucas - John Kelley

References

External links 

House (season 3) episodes
2007 American television episodes

fr:L'Homme de ses rêves